Sportvereeniging Rap is a Dutch football (soccer) club based in Amstelveen, Netherlands. 
It competes in the Vijfde Klasse, the eight tier of football in the Netherlands, and the sixth tier of Dutch amateur football.

The club was founded in 1917. It plays home matches at Sportpark 't Loopveld in Amstelveen.

Managers 
 Albert Evers

References

Football clubs in the Netherlands
Association football clubs established in 1917
Football clubs in Amsterdam
1917 establishments in the Netherlands
Sport in Amstelveen